In enzymology, a N-acetyllactosaminide 3-alpha-galactosyltransferase is an enzyme that catalyzes the chemical reaction

UDP-galactose + beta-D-galactosyl-(1->4)-beta-N-acetyl-D-glucosaminyl-R  UDP + alpha-D-galactosyl-(1->3)-beta-D-galactosyl-(1->4)-beta-N- acetylglucosaminyl-R

Thus, the two substrates of this enzyme are UDP-galactose and [[beta-D-galactosyl-(1->4)-beta-N-acetyl-D-glucosaminyl-R]], whereas its 3 products are UDP, [[alpha-D-galactosyl-(1->3)-beta-D-galactosyl-(1->4)-beta-N-]], and acetylglucosaminyl-R.

This enzyme belongs to the family of glycosyltransferases, specifically the hexosyltransferases.  The systematic name of this enzyme class is UDP-galactose:N-acetyllactosaminide 3-alpha-D-galactosyltransferase. Other names in common use include alpha-galactosyltransferase, UDP-Gal:beta-D-Gal(1,4)-D-GlcNAc alpha(1,3)-galactosyltransferase, UDP-Gal:N-acetyllactosaminide alpha(1,3)-galactosyltransferase, UDP-Gal:N-acetyllactosaminide alpha-1,3-D-galactosyltransferase, UDP-Gal:Galbeta1->4GlcNAc-R alpha1->3-galactosyltransferase, UDP-galactose-acetyllactosamine alpha-D-galactosyltransferase, UDPgalactose:beta-D-galactosyl-beta-1,4-N-acetyl-D-glucosaminyl-, glycopeptide alpha-1,3-D-galactosyltransferase, glucosaminylglycopeptide alpha-1,3-galactosyltransferase, uridine diphosphogalactose-acetyllactosamine, alpha1->3-galactosyltransferase, uridine diphosphogalactose-acetyllactosamine galactosyltransferase, uridine, diphosphogalactose-, galactosylacetylglucosaminylgalactosylglucosylceramide, galactosyltransferase, beta-D-galactosyl-N-acetylglucosaminylglycopeptide, and alpha-1,3-galactosyltransferase.  This enzyme participates in 3 metabolic pathways: glycosphingolipid biosynthesis - lactoseries, glycosphingolipid biosynthesis - neo-lactoseries, and glycan structures - biosynthesis 2.

Structural studies

References

 
 
 

EC 2.4.1
Enzymes of known structure